In 2014, Malaysia was the world's third largest manufacturer of photovoltaics equipment, behind China and the European Union.

In 2013, Malaysia's total production capacity for solar wafers, solar cells and solar panels totalled 4,042 MW.

Background 
Malaysia is a major hub for solar equipment manufacturing, with factories of companies like First Solar, Panasonic, TS Solartech, Jinko Solar, JA Solar, SunPower, Q-Cells, and SunEdison in locations like Kulim, Penang, Malacca, Cyberjaya, and Ipoh.

Many international companies have the majority of production capacity located in Malaysia, such as the American company First Solar which has over 2000 MW of production capacity located in Kulim and only 280 MW located in Ohio, and German-based Q-Cells which produces 1,100 MW worth of solar cells in Cyberjaya while producing only 200 MW worth of solar cells in Germany. SunPower's largest manufacturing facility with a capacity of 1400 MW is also located in Malacca.

Major manufacturing facilities

Malaysian companies 
TS Solartech
Location: Penang Science Park
Capacity: 500 MW (solar cells)
Production lines: 7

Foreign companies 
First Solar
Location: Kulim Hi-Tech Park
Capacity: 2000 MW (solar cells), 100 MW (solar modules)
Production lines: 24
JA Solar
Location: Penang
Capacity: 400 MW (solar cells)
Jinko Solar
Location: Penang
Capacity: 500 MW (solar cells), 450 MW (solar modules)
Production lines: 7
Panasonic Energy Malaysia
Location: Kulim Hi-Tech Park
Capacity: 300 MW
Q-Cells Malaysia
Location: Cyberjaya
Capacity: 1,100 MW (solar cells), 800 MW (solar modules)
Production lines: 4 (solar modules)
SunEdison
Location: Ipoh (solar wafer)
SunPower
Location: Malacca
Capacity: 1,400 MW (solar cells)
Production lines: 28
LONGi Solar
Location: Kuching, Sarawak 
Capacity: 600 MW (solar cells), 600 MW (solar modules)

References

Industry in Malaysia
Photovoltaics